Marian Catholic High School may refer to:

 Marian Catholic High School (Illinois), United States
 Marian Catholic High School (Pennsylvania), United States
 Mater Dei Catholic High School (Chula Vista, California), United States (formerly Marian Catholic High School)

See also
 Marion Catholic High School, Ohio, United States
 Marin Catholic High School, California, United States
 Marian Central Catholic High School, Illinois, United States
 Marian High School (disambiguation)